Coonoor, natively spelt as Kunnur, is a Taluk and a municipality of the Nilgiris district in the Indian State of Tamil Nadu. As of 2011, the town had a population of 45,494.

Demographics

According to 2011 census, Coonoor had a population of 45,494 with a sex-ratio of 1,058 females for every 1,000 males, much above the national average of 929. A total of 3,768 were under the age of six, constituting 1,871 males and 1,897 females. Scheduled Castes and Scheduled Tribes accounted for 27.92% and 23% of the population, respectively. The average literacy of the city was 84.79%, compared to the national average of 72.99%. The city had a total of 12384 households. There were a total of 17,421 workers, comprising 50 cultivators, 152 main agricultural labourers, 266 in household industries, 15,790 other workers, 1,163 marginal workers, 6 marginal cultivators, 66 marginal agricultural labourers, 31 marginal workers in household industries and 1,060 other marginal workers.

The town is the second largest in the Nilgiri hills after Ooty, the district headquarters. Coonoor has 61.81% Hindus, 23.99% Christians, 13.01% Muslims, 0.04% Sikhs, 0.06% Buddhists, 0.95% Jains and 0.08% Others. 0.05% of the respondents follow no religion or did not state their religion.

The town of Coonoor is broadly divided into two geographies - Lower Coonoor and Upper Coonoor. Lower Coonoor hosts the main Bus Depot, the Railway Station as also the bustling market complex. Upper Coonoor hosts locations like UPASI, Bedford, and Sim's Park.

Tourism
Spread over an area of 12 hectares, Sim's Park has a collection of over 1,000 plant species. The botanical garden is partly developed in the Japanese style and derived its name from J. D. Sim, the secretary of the Madras Club in 1874. The key attraction of the park is the annual fruit and vegetable show held in May. Dolphin's Nose Viewpoint is 10 km from Coonoor and provides a panoramic view of the vast expanse of the Nilgiri Hills and Catherine Falls. Tourists can trek from Lady Canning's Seat to Dolphin's Nose. Lamb's Rock, about 5½ km from Coonoor, is another vantage point. Droog Fort is located a distance of 13 km from Coonoor and was once used by Tipu Sultan in the 18th century. Law's Falls is a waterfall located 5 km from Coonoor, on the way to Mettupalayam.

Pomological Station is a research center of the State Agricultural Department for persimmon, pomegranates and apricot. Pasteur Institute located near Sim's park, was started in 1907. This institute develops vaccination for rabies. Central Silk Board has its silkworm breeding station (Satellite Silkworm Breeding Station of Central Sericultural Research & Training Institute-Mysuru) besides  state government silk farm at Springfield. Recently, floriculture and strawberry cultivation have taken root.

The Bollywood film, Kapoor & Sons, was shot in this town.

Administration and politics
Coonoor is a Taluk headquarters, responsible for six Panchayat villages, namely, Bandishola, Bearhatty, Burliar, Hubbathalai, Melur and Yedapalli. The Coonoor block contains the revenue villages of Adigaratty, Burliar, Coonoor Town, Yedapalli, Hubbathalai, Hullickal, Ketti, Melur. Coonoor assembly constituency is part of Nilgiris (Lok Sabha constituency).

Geography
It has an average elevation of 1,850 metres (6,070 feet) above sea level. It features a sub-tropical highland climate (Koppen;Cfb) due to high altitude.

2021 Indian Air Force Mil Mi-17 crash 
On 8 December 2021, a Mil Mi-17V-5 transport helicopter operated by the Indian Air Force (IAF) crashed between Coimbatore and Wellington in Tamil Nadu, after departing from Sulur Air Force Station. The helicopter was carrying Chief of Defence Staff General Bipin Rawat and 13 others, including his wife and staff. Thirteen people on board were killed in the immediate aftermath, and Group Captain Varun Singh died from his injuries at a hospital seven days later.

Gallery

See also
Adikaratti
Aruvankadu
Ketti
Kotagiri
Nilgiris (mountains)
Nilgiri tea
Ooty

Notes

References

External links

 
 Conoor Official history and tourism page on www.nilgiris.tn.gov.in.

 
Cities and towns in Nilgiris district
Hill stations in Tamil Nadu
Tourist attractions in Nilgiris district